Tonnerre Kalara Club of Yaoundé is a football club based in Yaoundé, Cameroon. The club was most prominent during the 1980s, winning all of their 5 national championships. They have also won the national cup 5 times. Among the club's most notable players have been the African player of the Century Roger Milla, Rigobert Song and the former FIFA World Player of the Year, Liberian George Weah.

Palmarès
African Cup Winners' Cup: 1
1975

Cameroon Premiere Division: 5
1981, 1983, 1984, 1987, 1988

Cameroon Cup: 5
1958, 1974, 1987, 1989, 1991

Performance in CAF competitions
 African Cup of Champions Clubs: 5 appearances
1982: First Round
1984: Second Round
1985: First Round
1988: Second Round
1989: Semi-finals

CAF Cup: 1 appearance
2002 - Finalist

CAF Cup Winners' Cup: 4 appearances
1975 - Champion
1976 - Finalist
1990 - First Round
1992 - First Round

References

External links
Official website

 
Association football clubs established in 1974
Football clubs in Cameroon
Football clubs in Yaoundé
Sport in Yaoundé
1974 establishments in Cameroon
Sports clubs in Cameroon
African Cup Winners Cup winning clubs